Megam Karuththirukku is a 1987 Indian Tamil-language drama film directed by Rama Narayanan, starring Prabhu and Raghuvaran. It was released on 6 March 1987.

Plot

Cast 
Prabhu
Raghuvaran
Senthil
Rekha
Madhuri
Charle
Vennira Aadai Moorthy
Kallapetti Singaram
S. S. Chandran
Usilai Mani
Kovai Sarala

Soundtrack 
The music was composed by Manoj–Gyan.

Reception 
The Indian Express said the film "provides routine entertainment. It is passable fare".

References

External links 

1980s Tamil-language films
1987 films
Films directed by Rama Narayanan
Films scored by Manoj–Gyan
Indian drama films